"Neck & Wrist" is a song by American rapper Pusha T featuring fellow American rappers Jay-Z and Pharrell Williams. Produced by the latter, it was released on April 6, 2022 as the third single from the former's fourth studio album It's Almost Dry (2022).

Background
In 2020, actor and comedian Faizon Love claimed that Jay-Z had been lying about his drug-dealing past. Jay-Z addresses Love's comments in the song.

The artwork of the single was created by Sterling Ruby, who also previously designed the artwork for Pusha T's single "Diet Coke".

Composition and lyrics
The song finds Pusha T and Jay-Z reflecting on their music careers and the benefits of their luxurious lifestyles, over an instrumental of heavy drum beats. In his verse, Jay-Z begins with responding to Faizon Love's claims ("The phase I'm on, love, I wouldn't believe it either / I'd be like, 'Jay-Z's a cheater,' I wouldn't listen to reason either"), and raps that if The Notorious B.I.G. were alive, he and him would have dominated the New York hip hop scene as The Commission, a supergroup that Jay-Z and B.I.G. had planned to form before the latter's death.

Critical reception
Jessica McKinney of Complex praised the song's cocaine metaphors and called Jay-Z's performance "captivating".

Response
Fans have speculated that Jay-Z had dissed American rapper Birdman in the song with the lyrics, "I blew bird money, y'all talk in Twitter feeds". Audio engineer Young Guru, a longtime collaborator and associate of Jay-Z, suggested that the line could have multiple meanings behind it and stated it was not a diss toward Birdman.

In an interview with VladTV around a week after the song was released, Faizon Love denied that Jay-Z had dissed him.

Charts

References

2022 singles
2022 songs
Pusha T songs
Jay-Z songs
Pharrell Williams songs
GOOD Music singles
Def Jam Recordings singles
Song recordings produced by Pharrell Williams
Songs written by Pusha T
Songs written by Jay-Z
Songs written by Pharrell Williams